Jesse Frederick Keeler (born 11 November 1976) is a Canadian musician. He is known as the bassist, backing vocalist, and synthesist of Canadian dance-punk duo Death from Above  and one half of the electronic music duo MSTRKRFT. In addition to singing, Keeler plays drums, guitar, bass, keyboards, and saxophone, as well as work as a producer, lending to music of a variety of styles over the course of his career, including punk, hardcore, rock, house, and electro.

Music career

Death from Above

MSTRKRFT

Discography

Standing 8 
 Standing 8 (1998)
 Split w/ This Robot Kills (?)

Black Cat # 13 
 Wrist Towards Elbow (2000)
 I Blast Off! (2000)
 The Experiment Vol. 2: Casino Steel Vs. Black Cat # 13 (2000)
 Split w/ International Strike Force (2000)
 The Experiment, Vol. 1 (2000)

Casino Steel 
 The Experiment Vol. 2: Casino Steel Vs. Black Cat # 13 (2000)

Femme Fatale 
 As You Sow, So Shall You Reap (2002)
 Fire Baptism (2002)
 From the Abundance of the Heart, the Mouth Speaks (2004)

Death from Above 

 You're a Woman, I'm a Machine (2004)
 The Physical World (2014)
 Outrage! Is Now (2017)
 Is 4 Lovers (2021)

MSTRKRFT 

 The Looks (2006)
 Fist of God (2009)
 OPERATOR (2016)

Solo 
 "Beehive"/"Towel Swinger" (2010) (w/ St. Mandrew)
 Face Pump (2010) (w/  St. Mandrew)
Deathstalker (Scorpion's Theme) (from Mortal Kombat 9)

References

External links 
 Video Interview with Jesse F Keeler
 MSTRKRFT Official Website
 MSTRKRFT MySpace Profile
 Death from Above 1979 Official Website
 Death from Above 1979 MySpace Profile

1976 births
Living people
Canadian rock bass guitarists
Canadian dance musicians
Canadian indie rock musicians
Musicians from Toronto
20th-century Canadian bass guitarists
21st-century Canadian bass guitarists
Canadian rock guitarists
Canadian male guitarists
20th-century Canadian drummers
21st-century Canadian drummers
Male bass guitarists
21st-century Canadian male singers
Canadian people of Indian descent